Producers Guild Film Award for Best Actor in a Drama Series is an award given by Apsara Producers Guild to recognize excellence in film and television, to recognize a male actor in television drama series who has delivered an outstanding performance in a leading role.

The award was first awarded in 2004 under the title Best Actor in a Drama Series and is awarded every year annually thereafter.

Winners

References

External links
 Official Website: Producers Guild Film Awards

Producers Guild Film Awards
TV awards for lead actor